Pseudocentrinus is a genus of flower weevils in the beetle family Curculionidae. There are about nine described species in Pseudocentrinus.

Species
These nine species belong to the genus Pseudocentrinus:
 Pseudocentrinus deceptus Champion & G.C., 1908
 Pseudocentrinus hybrida Champion & G.C., 1908
 Pseudocentrinus lucidulus Hustache, 1930
 Pseudocentrinus mourei Bondar, 1944
 Pseudocentrinus ochraceus (Boheman, 1844)
 Pseudocentrinus punctatus Hustache, 1941
 Pseudocentrinus seriesetosus Hustache, 1924
 Pseudocentrinus sparsus Kuschel, 1955
 Pseudocentrinus uniformis Casey, 1920

References

Further reading

 
 
 

Baridinae
Articles created by Qbugbot